Ænigma Mystica is the tenth studio album studio from French death metal act Misanthrope. It comes in a regular version exclusively in French and a two disk deluxe edition with the French disk, English versions of chosen tracks as well as other re-recorded songs from past albums.

Track listing 

Limited Edition Bonus Disk

Limited Edition Bonus DVD

Personnel

Band Members
 S.A.S. de l'Argilière : Vocals
 Jean-Jacques Moréac : Bass & Keyboards
 Anthony Scemama : Guitars & Keyboards
 Gaël Féret : Drums

Production
Fernando Pereira Lopes - production, engineering, mixing
Bruno "L'Ensorcelé" Gruel -  mastering
Executive production by Holy Records & Aeternitas Musique
Séverine Foujanet (Holy Records) - Cover artwork, layout and graphic arts
Christophe Hargoues - Musicians' photography
Jean-Jacques Moréac & S.A.S de l'Argilière - Artwork photography

References 

Misanthrope (band) albums
2013 albums